Kem is a river in Krasnoyarsk Krai, Siberia, Russia. It is a left bank tributary of the Yenisey. 

The name of the river Kem comes from the ancient word "kem" or "hem" that has a meaning of "great river". This toponymy is very popular and widespread from Siberia up to Karelia and Finland.

Course
The river flows across the West Siberian Plain through the districts of Bolshemurtinsky, Kazachinsky, Pirovsky, and Yeniseysky District before discharging into the Yenisei River close to the town of Yeniseysk at 2045 kilometers before the mouth. The Kem is 356 kilometres (221 miles) long. Its drainage basin covers a total area of 8,940 square kilometres (3,452 square miles). The most important tributaries of the Kem are the Tyya at the 97 kilometer from the mouth and the Belaya at the 115 kilometer from the mouth. Both major tributaries are on the left side. The source of the Kem is located in Bolshemurtinsky District where it rises as a small creek in the East Siberian taiga. Due to the tributary rivers, towards the mouth river reaches 45 meters of width.

The Kem flows mostly through the plain and vegetation grows directly up to the river shores and water. The bottom of the river is covered with a lot of clay and sandy-clay and a river water is generally not clear. The upper reaches of the river flows through the mixed type taiga covered with conifers (larch, fir, spruce, cedar), birch and aspen, as well as through the areas that are categorized as a standard mixed forest.  Due to the tributary rivers, towards the mouth the river reaches 45 meters of width.

Protected area
Kem's Biological Reserve is located on the 16 000 hectares of the land that stretched along the banks of the river. In 1963 the project of restoration of population of beavers started here with 20 individuals of this species being brought in the region.

See also
List of rivers of Russia

References

Rivers of Krasnoyarsk Krai